Castetpugon is a commune of 217 inhabitants in the Pyrénées-Atlantiques department in south-western France. It belongs to the arrondissement of Pau.

See also
Communes of the Pyrénées-Atlantiques department

References

Communes of Pyrénées-Atlantiques